Bruno Edgar Silva Almeida (born 18 March 1994), known as Bruno Ramires, is a Brazilian professional footballer who plays as a midfielder for Indian Super League club Bengaluru.

Club career

Bengaluru 
In August 2021, Indian Super League club Bengaluru confirmed the signing Ramires on a two-year deal.

On 20 November, he made his debut for the club against NorthEast United in the Indian Super League, which ended in a 4–2 win. He registered his first assist of the season against Chennaiyin on 30 December, in a 4–2 win. He cushioned the ball for Pratik Chaudhari to hit it into the back of the net from a Roshan Singh corner.

Ramires made his first appearance of the 2022–23 season on 17 August, in the Durand Cup in a 2–1 win over Jamshedpur at the Kishore Bharati Stadium. On 18 September, he was adjudged man of the match in the final against Mumbai City in a 2–1 win, which secured Bengaluru's first Durand Cup title.

Career statistics

Club

Honours

Club
Cruzeiro
 Série A: 2014

Vitória
 Campeonato Baiano: 2017

Bengaluru
 Durand Cup: 2022

External links

References 

1994 births
Living people
Brazilian footballers
Brazilian expatriate footballers
Association football defenders
Cruzeiro Esporte Clube players
Esporte Clube Vitória players
Moreirense F.C. players
Associação Atlética Ponte Preta players
Centro Sportivo Alagoano players
C.D. Feirense players
Belenenses SAD players
Campeonato Brasileiro Série A players
Campeonato Brasileiro Série B players
Primeira Liga players
Liga Portugal 2 players
Expatriate footballers in Portugal
Association football midfielders
Sportspeople from Salvador, Bahia